The Quebec Caribous (or Les Caribous) were a member of the National Lacrosse League.  The franchise was originally the Syracuse Stingers who were founded in 1974 with the creation of the league.  They played their first and only season in Quebec in 1975 and were the Nations Cup champions, defeating their provincial rivals the Montreal Quebecois in the best-of-seven final series.  The league disbanded on Friday February 13, 1976 due to 3 of the 6 teams going bankrupt (among other issues).

Lacrosse clubs established in 1975
Lacrosse teams in Quebec
1975 establishments in Quebec
Lacrosse clubs disestablished in 1976
1976 disestablishments in Quebec